John Gardiner 'Jackie' Webb (born 6 May 1943) was a Scottish footballer who played for Dumbarton and Portadown.

References

1943 births
Scottish footballers
Dumbarton F.C. players
Scottish Football League players
Living people
Association football wingers